Climate change is expected to increase the severity of most meteorological conditions which will in turn increase the infection area and seasonal duration of waterborne diseases. Climate change, and its effects are already being seen around the globe in warmer water, drought, higher rainfall, and flooding. Related changes in waterborne diseases are already being documented globally and are expected to increase, not only in developing countries but also in already developed countries. Extreme precipitation, storm surges, and flooding are already on the rise due to climate change. These present a large risk to current system capacities and could lead to disruption or failure in the infrastructure. The current trend shows a positive correlation between waterborne diseases and meteorological conditions changing due to climate change.

Changes in precipitation and water cycle
Climate change is forecast to have substantial effects on the water cycle, with an increase in both frequency and intensity of droughts and heavy precipitation events. Heavy precipitation events are expected to also increase flood events in the future. Precipitation events are expected to increase in intensity, but lessen in amount and duration. This will cause an increase in heavy flooding events during the precipitation event and droughts in-between. There is also an expected increased contrast between the wet and dry regions and seasons globally. Due to the increasing temperature and change in precipitation events waterborne diseases are among the primary health impacts expected from the changing climate.

Water-borne diseases 
Climate change is expected to have a major impact on waterborne diseases. These are diseases caused by a pathogen transmitted through water. The symptoms of waterborne diseases typically include diarrhea, fever and other flu-like symptoms, neurological disorders, and liver damage. Changes in climate have a large effect on the distribution of microbial species. These communities are very complex and can be extremely sensitive to external climate stimuli. One of the most commonly transmitted waterborne disease categories are the diarrhea diseases. These diseases are transmitted through unsafe drinking water or recreational water contact. Diarrheal diseases account for 10–12% of deaths in children under five, as the second leading cause of death in children this age. They are also the second leading cause of death in low and middle income countries. Diarrhea diseases account for an estimated 1.4–1.9 million deaths worldwide.

There is a very high risk of increase in waterborne diseases worldwide due to climate change, according to the Intergovernmental Panel on Climate Change (IPCC).

Climate change effects on waterborne diseases

Temperature 
The average global temperature is rising and is expected to continue to rise at a rapid rate. High temperatures can alter the survival, replication, and virulence of a pathogen. Higher temperatures can also increase the pathogen yields in animal reservoirs. During the warmer summer months an increase in yield of bacteria from drinking water delivery systems has been recorded. During times of warmer temperatures water consumption rates are also typically higher. These together increase the probability of pathogen ingestion and infection. With the known increase in global temperature averages and the positive association between temperature and waterborne diseases, especially diarrheal diseases, the number of waterborne outbreaks will most likely increase. In hotter regions, especially ones with low water supply already, there will be an increase in amount of runoff water collected and reused. This could lead to an increase in consumption of contaminated water. With an increase in not only temperature, but also higher nutrient concentrations due to runoff there will be an increase in cyanobacterial blooms.

Rainfall and flooding 
Climate change has been modeled to increase the intensity of precipitation events leading to an increase in major flooding events. Studies have shown an increase in gastrointestinal and diarrheal diseases associated with major precipitation events and increased temperature. Due to heavy rainfall events leading to increased runoff pathogens become mobilized and compromise water and sanitation infrastructure. Flooding can displace populations and can lead to a variety of impacts on health. Pathogens can come from a variety of locations including human and/ or animal excrement that are present in soils or fertilizer runoff from farms. Heavy rainfall leads to the resuspension of pathogens in soils leading to the contamination of groundwater. The rainfall mobilizes these pathogens and transports them into waterways making it more likely for individuals to be exposed to the pathogen. Heavy rainfall leads to an overflow of the storm drains, which are sometimes combined with the sewage system. In these areas contaminated water can be mixed into the rivers.  There are also reports of floodwaters leading to the contamination of sources of underground drinking water. Between 20–40% of outbreaks including both ground and surface water were associated with extreme precipitation events. Typically flooding is associated as a risk of increased waterborne diseases more so in developing countries, but can affect the developed world in places where water sources are already compromised. In the United States there are as many as 900,000 cases and 900 deaths annually from waterborne diseases that have been linked to both droughts and flooding.

Droughts 
The amount of water within the global water cycle is constant, the amount of water evaporated from waterbodies has to come back down as precipitation. If climate change is causing precipitation events to increase in intensity then either the duration of the events has to be shorter, there has to be more time in between events, or both. There is also the possibility of precipitation events occurring less often in one area and becoming stronger in another. This will cause droughts in areas with less precipitation, or longer periods of time between precipitation events. Droughts lead to an increase in sediment and contaminant levels in water bodies as water is evaporated out. This causes pathogens to concentrate in limited water supplies. Droughts will also cause more people to collect rain water and runoff, and in turn pathogens within the water increasing the risk of exposure.

Examples

Vibrio infections 
In the United States approximately 80,000 people are infected and 100 die from vibriosis yearly. Vibrio infections are caused by consuming raw or undercooked seafood, or by exposing an open wound to contaminated sea water. Vibrio infections are most likely to occur during the warm season, May through October. Vibrio illnesses are increasing worldwide, in the United States it has increased by an estimated 41% between 1996 and 2005. Vibrio infections are recently being reported where historically it did not occur. The warming climate seems to be playing a substantial role in the increase in cases and area of occurrence.

Nontuberculous mycobacteria 
Nontuberculous mycobacteria (NTM) is a lung disease that mainly affects people with an underlying lung disease or a weakened immune system. The organisms that cause NTM are commonly found in soil and water.  Currently in the United States there are more than 86,000 people infected with NTM. Climate change causes an increase in natural disasters which cause a spread of the NTM pathogen. In the United States, states with a higher occurrence of natural disasters also show a higher prevalence of NTM infections. One study done looked at the prevalence of NTM in the United States in the years following Hurricanes IKE, Katrina, and Rita. The study found the highest prevalence of NTM occurred in places most affected by the hurricanes.

Legionella 
Legionella infections have flu-like symptoms and can sometimes lead to pneumonia. It is found in water and some potting soils. Legionella is commonly transmitted through inhaling contaminated aerosols, commonly from water sprays, jets, or mists. It can also occur from aspiration of contaminate water. Legionella is known to show a seasonal pattern with a peak during the warm months in temperate regions. With climate change expected to continue to increase the global temperature average some locations will stay warm longer. This could lead to more exposure as the gardening season expands causing more exposure to potting soils and water sprayers. Longer hotter summers could also lead to an increase in the use of cooling systems, such as cooling towers. These are known as hotspots for legionella outbreaks.

See also
 Effects of climate change on human health
 Climate change and infectious diseases

References 

Effects of climate change
Climate change and society
Waterborne diseases
Climate change and the environment